The 2016 season was Minnesota United FC's seventh season of existence and their sixth consecutive and final season playing in the North American Soccer League, the second division of the American soccer pyramid. In 2017, Minnesota United FC joined MLS as an expansion team along with Atlanta United FC.

Club

Transfers

Transfers In

Transfers Out

Loans In

Management 

  Nick Rogers – President
  Manny Lagos – Sporting Director
  Carl Craig – Head Coach
  Ian Fuller – Assistant Coach
  Paul O'Connor – Goalkeeping Coach
  Peter Rivard – Reserves Team Coach
  Craig Mallace – Director of Camps & Youth Development
  Dr. Corey Wulf – Team Doctor
  Dr. Brad Moser – Team Doctor
  Yoshiyuki Ono – Team Athletic Trainer
  David Bloomquist – Team Athletic Trainer

Friendlies

Simple Invitational

Pre-season

Mid-season

Competitions

Overview 

{| class="wikitable" style="text-align: center"
|-
!rowspan=2|Competition
!colspan=8|Record
|-
!
!
!
!
!
!
!
!
|-
| NASL Spring Season

|-
| NASL Fall Season

|-
| U.S. Open Cup

|-
! Total

NASL Spring Championship

Results summary

Results by round

Matches

NASL Fall Championship

Results summary

Results by round

Matches

NASL Playoffs

U.S. Open Cup

Squad statistics

Appearances

Numbers in parentheses denote appearances as substitute.
Players with no appearances not included in the list.

Goalscorers

Includes all competitive matches.

Disciplinary record

See also 

 Minnesota United FC
 2016 North American Soccer League season
 2016 in American soccer

References 

2016
2016 North American Soccer League season
American soccer clubs 2016 season
2016 in sports in Minnesota